KAOI (1110 AM) is a radio station located in Kihei, Maui County, Hawaii. The station is owned by Visionary Related Entertainment. It broadcasts nationally syndicated and local talk shows.

Translators

External links
 KAOI AM 1110 official website
 Call Sign History

 

Radio stations established in 1979
AOI
Talk radio stations in the United States
1979 establishments in Hawaii